Nesomys, also called red forest rats, is a genus of rodent in the family Nesomyidae. It is found only on Madagascar, and contains the following species:
 White-bellied nesomys (Nesomys audeberti)
 Western nesomys (Nesomys lambertoni)
 Nesomys narindaensis †
 Island mouse (Nesomys rufus)

References

 
 
 
Taxa named by Wilhelm Peters
Rodent genera
Taxonomy articles created by Polbot